Kayanza Province is one of the 18 provinces of Burundi. Its capital city is also called Kayanza centre.

Communes
It is divided administratively into the following communes:

 Commune of Butaganzwa
 Commune of Gahombo
 Commune of Gatara
 Commune of Kabarore
 Commune of Kayanza
 Commune of Matongo
 Commune of Muhanga
 Commune of Muruta
 Commune of Rango

References

 
Provinces of Burundi